The Hongkong Chinese Bank Limited (HKCB) (Traditional Chinese: 香港華人銀行有限公司) was a bank in Hong Kong. It was owned by HKCB Bank Holding Company Limited, which in turn was majority owned by a joint venture company owned by listed companies Lippo China Resources and the China Resources Enterprise. The bank was acquired and merged into CITIC Ka Wah Bank. It was one of the pilot banks in Hong Kong to accept the digital signature of Hongkong Post.

History 
1954: Hongkong Chinese Bank was founded in Hong Kong.
1998: China Resources Enterprise acquired 50% shares of Lippo CRE (Financial Services) Limited.
January 2002: CITIC Ka Wah Bank acquired Hongkong Chinese Bank for HK$4.2 billion.
November 2002: CITIC Ka Wah Bank merged with Hongkong Chinese Bank. The banking business of CITIC Ka Wah Bank was transferred to Hongkong Chinese Bank. CITIC Ka Wah Bank became a financial holding company operating under the name CITIC International Financial Holdings Limited, while Hongkong Chinese Bank's name was changed to CITIC Ka Wah Bank Limited.

Footnotes

See others 
CITIC Ka Wah Bank
CITIC International Financial Holdings
Macau Chinese Bank

References

Banks established in 1955
Defunct banks of Hong Kong
China Resources
Banks disestablished in 2002
1955 establishments in Hong Kong